KCUP (1230 AM) is a radio station broadcasting a News/Talk format. Licensed to Toledo, Oregon, United States, the station is currently owned by Rubin Broadcasting, Inc. and operated by Oregon Pacific & Eastern

History
The station was originally assigned the call letters KTDO. On 1992-02-10, the station changed its call sign to KZUS. On 1997-10-10, the station changed its call sign to KPPT, and on 2005-02-09, to the current KCUP.

On June 18, 2017, KCUP changed their format from news/talk to regional Mexican, branded as "La Gran D 1230 AM".  (info taken from stationintel.com)

In 2019, KCUP changed their format from regional Mexican back to news/talk. On October 1,2022 KCUP changed the format to "Oldies" from the 60s, 70s & 80s. Great Music from Three Decades hand selected for the Oregon Coast.  Just added is the Nationally Syndicated  "The 80's Meltdown"  A look back at the "Greatest Decade of Music", Hosted by Oregon Resident Bob Larson. "The 80's Meltdown Airs on Saturday Nights at 8PM.  This Coast to Coast Program is Syndicated by "Fishnet Syndication".  Also featured is "Community Callander" Keeping local residents updated with local events and happenings.

References

External links

CUP
Lincoln County, Oregon
Radio stations established in 1960
1960 establishments in Oregon